In differential geometry, Cayley's ruled cubic surface is the ruled cubic surface 
 
It contains a nodal line of self-intersection and two cuspital points at infinity.

References

External links
Cubical ruled surface

Algebraic surfaces
Differential geometry